The Guerin d'Oro (Golden Guerin) was an annual award which was handed out by the Italian magazine Guerin Sportivo to the best Serie A football player. 

The first winner of the award was Claudio Sala, while the last was Carlos Tevez.

History and regulations
Established 1976, the Guerin d'Oro was awarded to the player in Serie A with at least 19 games played, which had obtained the best average-media rating. The latter was obtained by calculating the average rating of each player's season, based on weekly rating reports of Guerin Sportivo and the three main Italian sports dailies: La Gazzetta dello Sport, Corriere dello Sport, and Tuttosport.

The award was suspended during the 2009–10 and 2010–11 seasons and discontinued after the 2014–15 season.

Winners

See also
 Gran Galà del Calcio
 Serie A Awards
 Serie A Footballer of the Year

References

External links
 Guerin Sportivo official website
 Guerin d'Oro at RSSSF.com

Association football trophies and awards
Italian football trophies and awards
Awards established in 1976